The Stewart–Screven Monument is a monument in Midway, Georgia, United States. Erected in 1915, the monument honors Daniel Stewart and James Screven, two generals from the American Revolutionary War. The monument is located in a cemetery in the Midway Historic District.

History

Background 
Midway, Georgia was established in 1752. During the American Revolution, the area around Midway became a hotspot of Patriot activity, and Lyman Hall, who served as a delegate from Georgia in the Continental Congress, was from Midway. During the reorganization of the state of Georgia during the American Revolutionary War, the county that Midway was in was named Liberty County in recognition of this. Midway was also the home of two noted soldiers who served as generals in the Continental Army during the war: James Screven and Daniel Stewart. In November 1778, Screven was mortally wounded during military action in Midway. Both Stewart and Screven would later receive multiple honors due to their involvement in the war, including serving as the namesakes for several places in Georgia, such as Fort Screven, Fort Stewart, Screven County, and Stewart County.

Erection and dedication 
In 1910, the United States Congress passed an act appropriating $10,000 towards the erection of a monument honoring both Screven and Stewart in Midway. The push to erect a monument to honor the two had been championed by Willian Neyle Colquitt, a prominent citizen of Savannah, Georgia who, after the act was passed, was made secretary of the commission to erect the monument. Other members of the commission included U.S. Senator Augustus O. Bacon, U.S. Representative Charles G. Edwards, and ex-President of the United States Theodore Roosevelt as the honorary chairman. The monument was erected by the McNeel Marble Company. It was officially dedicated on April 26, 1915, with multiple military companies in attendance, including several troops from Fort Screven. The dedication ceremony was attended by about 5,000 spectators. Prior to its unveiling, it was covered by two large American flags. Both Roosevelt and then-President Woodrow Wilson sent letters that were read aloud during the ceremony.

Design 

It is located in the center of the cemetery near the Midway church, and it is the tallest structure in the cemetery. Four copper plates adorn each face of the monument near its base, with the following inscriptions on them:

The plate on the west face of the monument bears no text and instead depicts the Midway Church building.

See also 

 1915 in art

References

Bibliography 

 
 
 

1915 establishments in Georgia (U.S. state)
1915 sculptures
American Revolutionary War monuments and memorials
Cemetery art
Marble sculptures in Georgia (U.S. state)
Monuments and memorials on the National Register of Historic Places in Georgia (U.S. state)
National Register of Historic Places in Liberty County, Georgia